Bill S.978 or the Commercial Felony Streaming Act was a bill that was introduced to the United States Senate. It was proposed by Amy Klobuchar, Chris Coons, and John Cornyn on May 12, 2011. It would have been an amendment to US Code Title 18 Section 2319, that would make unauthorized streaming of copyrighted material for the purpose of "commercial advantage or personal financial gain", a felony (under current law, unauthorized streaming is only a misdemeanor). The penalty could include up to five years of prison-time. The bill defined illegal streaming as streaming ten or more times in a 180-day period. Furthermore, the value of the illegally streamed material would have to be greater than $2,500, or the licensing fees would have to be over $5,000.

Several articles were published, expressing concern as to whether the bill would have affected those who stream or post videos of copyrighted content (e.g. video games, TV shows, music) on public sites such as YouTube. The bill did not directly address this aspect. Although the bill would never become law, there was an outcry with several negative reactions against it on YouTube and other websites during July 2011.

Both Klobuchar and Coons stated that the bill was not intended to affect the aforementioned aspects, instead it would only target websites or people who profit from illegally streaming copyrighted material.

Status
The bill was considered in committee and introduced to the full chamber during the 2011 congressional session. However, it never received a vote on the Senate floor, and its content was consolidated months later into the Stop Online Piracy Act which was ultimately never passed.

See also
PROTECT IP Act
Stop Online Piracy Act
Protecting Children from Internet Pornographers Act of 2011
Protecting Lawful Streaming Act

References

External links
The text of the bill 
Official version as received by the Senate

United States proposed federal intellectual property legislation
United States proposed federal criminal legislation
Proposed legislation of the 112th United States Congress